Jiangsu Donghai Senior High School, is a high school located in Lianyungang, Jiangsu, People's Republic of China. Founded in 1953, the school is a national-level model high school, a four-star high school in Jiangsu, and one of the first elite schools in Lianyungang. It is also one of the largest and the most advanced high schools in the province.

The school offers English classes conducted by local and foreign teachers. It is an outstanding student base for multiple national universities, including Harbin Institute of Technology, Southeast University, China University of Mining and Technology, Southwest University of Political Science & Law, Nanjing Tech University, and Nanjing University of Information Science and Technology.

References

Schools in China